The Western Reserve Conference is an OHSAA athletics conference that began with the 2015-16 school year.  The name is resurrected from three previous incarnations that most recently folded in 2007 when the Northeast Ohio Conference was created.

Members (2015-)

History
The conference is named after the Connecticut Western Reserve, which historically included most of Northeast Ohio. There have been three previous athletic conferences in the region that used the name "Western Reserve". The first existed from 1919 to 1948, a second was formed in 1948 and existed until 1968, and a third conference was founded in 1996 and functioned until 2007.

Trolley League/Western Reserve League
The first athletic conference to use the name "Western Reserve" was founded in 1919 as the Trolley League as its members were all located along the interurban trolley line. Around 1931, the league became known as the Western Reserve League after several additional schools joined and the trolley line itself was abandoned. The conference disbanded in 1948 after its membership had been reduced to just five schools a few years prior.

 Cuyahoga Falls Black Tigers (1919–29, 1937–48)
 Kenmore Cardinals (1919–29)
 Ravenna Ravens (1919–48)
 Kent Roosevelt Rough Riders (1919–48)
 Kent State Blue Devils (1919–37)
 Bedford Bearcats (1921-2?)
 Medina Battling Bees (19??-31)
 Orrville Red Riders (1920-1924, 1926-1929, 1932–38)
 Ellet Orangemen (1931–37)
 Wadsworth Grizzlies (1931–41)
 Akron St. Vincent Fighting Irish (1938–48)

Lake County League/Western Reserve Conference 
The second conference to use the Western Reserve name started as the Lake County League in the early 1920s. The conference was renamed the Western Reserve Conference in 1948 and played 20 more years before it folded in 1968.

 Fairport Harbor Fairport Harding Skippers (1920s-28, to Lake Shore League, 1948–51, to Northeastern Conference, 1962–68, to Lake Shore League)
 Painesville Harvey Red Raiders (1920s-28, to Lake Shore League)
 Kirtland Hornets (1920s-60, to Great Lakes Athletic Conference)
 Madison Blue Streaks (1920s-68, to Lake Shore League)
 Perry Pirates (1920s-68, to Lake Shore League)
 Willoughby Union Rangers (1920s-28, to Lake Shore League)
 Wickliffe Blue Devils (1920s-57, to Northeastern Conference)
 Chardon Hilltoppers (1948–64, to Chagrin Valley Conference)
 Painesville Riverside Beavers (1949–51, to NortheasternConference)
 Conneaut Trojans (1951–59, to Northeastern Conference)
 Ashtabula Harbor Mariners (1951–65, to Northeastern Conference)
 Lakeland Rowe Vikings (1951–64, consolidated into Conneaut)
 Jefferson Falcons (1954–68, to Northeastern Conference)
 Geneva Spencer Wildcats (1957–61, consolidated into Geneva)
 Edgewood Warriors (1962–65, to Northeastern Conference)

Western Reserve Conference (1996–2007)
A third Western Reserve Conference was formed in 1996, as the five remaining schools from the Metro League merged with five schools from the Chagrin Valley Conference. The conference was divided into north and south divisions with the former CVC schools in the north and the former Metro League schools in the south. Additional members were added to create two six-team divisions. The divisions were eliminated in 2005 after four schools left the conference. Two years later, this version of the WRC combined with the Pioneer Conference to become the Northeast Ohio Conference.

 Barberton Magics (1996–2005)
 Cuyahoga Falls Black Tigers (1996–2007)
 Chagrin Falls Kenston Bombers (1996–2005)
 Pepper Pike Orange Lions (1996–1998)
 Ravenna Ravens (1996–2005)
 Kent Roosevelt Rough Riders (1996–2005)
 Solon Comets (1996–2007)
 Stow-Munroe Falls Bulldogs (1996–2007)
 Twinsburg Tigers (1996–2007)
 Chesterland West Geauga Wolverines (1996–1998)
 Hudson Explorers (1997–2007)
 Macedonia Nordonia Knights (1997–2007)
 Lyndhurst Brush Arcs (1998–2007)
 Mayfield Wildcats (1998–2007)

References

Sports organizations established in 2015
Sports in Greater Cleveland
Ohio high school sports conferences
2015 establishments in Ohio